Tellina is a widely distributed genus of marine bivalve molluscs, in the family Tellinidae.

Species 

 Tellina agilis Stimpson, 1857: northern dwarf tellin, northern dwarf-tellin : synonym of Ameritella agilis (Stimpson, 1857)
 Tellina alternata Say, 1822: alternate tellin   
 Tellina americana Dall, 1900: American tellin   
 Tellina amianta Dall, 1900    
 Tellina angulosa Gmelin, 1791: angulate tellin   
 Tellina bodegensis Hinds, 1845: Bodega tellin   
 Tellina candeana D'Orbigny, 1842: cande tellin, wedge tellin 
 Tellina carpenteri Dall, 1900: Carpenter tellin   
 Tellina cerrosiana Dall, 1900 
 Tellina coani Keen, 1971    
 Tellina colorata Dall, 1900: tinted tellin   
 Tellina consobrina D'Orbigny, 1842: consobrine tellin   
 Tellina cristallina Spengler, 1798: crystal tellin   
 Tellina cumingii Hanley, 1844    
 Tellina diantha Boss, 1964    
 Tellina donacina
 Tellina edgari Iredale, 1915
 Tellina elucens Mighels, 1845 
 Tellina eugonia Suter, 1913     
 Tellina euvitrea Boss, 1964: shiny tellin   
 Tellina exerythra Boss, 1964: bloodless tellin   
 Tellina fabula Gmelin, 1791    
 Tellina fausta Pulteney, 1799: favored tellin   
 Tellina flucigera Dall, 1908
 Tellina gaimardi Iredale, 1915: angled wedge shell
 Tellina gibber von Ihering, 1907    
 Tellina gouldii Hanley, 1846: cuneate tellin   
 Tellina guildingii Hanley, 1844: guilding tellin 
 Tellina huttoni E.A. Smith, 1885    
 Tellina idae Dall, 1891: Ida tellin   
 Tellina inaequistriata Donovan, 1802    
 Tellina iris Say, 1822: rainbow tellin   
 Tellina juttingae Altena, 1965: jutting tellin   
 Tellina laevigata Linnaeus, 1758: smooth tellin   
 Tellina lamellata Carpenter, 1855    
 Tellina lineata Turton, 1819: rose-petal tellin
 Tellina linguafelis Linnaeus, 1758
 Tellina listeri Röding, 1798: speckled tellin: synonym of Tellinella listeri (Röding, 1798)
 Tellina magna Spengler, 1798: great tellin   
 Tellina mera Say, 1834: pure tellin   
 Tellina meropsis Dall, 1900: oval tellin   
 Tellina modesta Carpenter, 1864: plain tellin   
 Tellina nicoyana Hertlein & Strong, 1949
 Tellina nitens C. B. Adams, 1845: shiny dwarf tellin, shiny dwarf-tellin   
 Tellina nuculoides Reeve, 1854: salmon tellin   
 Tellina oahuana     
 Tellina ochracea Carpenter, 1864    
 Tellina oligoscissulata Jung, 1969
 Tellina pacifica Dall, 1900    
 Tellina paramera Boss, 1964: perfect tellin   
 Tellina persica Dall et Simpson, 1901: apricot tellin   
 Tellina pristiphora Dall, 1900    
 Tellina probina Boss, 1964: slandered tellin   
 Tellina proclivis Hertlein et Strong, 1949    
 Tellina prora Hanley, 1844    
 Tellina punicea Born, 1778: watermelon tellin   
 Tellina pygmaea     
 Tellina radiata Linnaeus, 1758: sunrise tellin   
 Tellina recurvata Hertlein et Strong, 1949    
 Tellina rickettsi Coan & Valentich-Scott, 2010
 Tellina rubescens Hanley, 1844    
 Tellina sadeghianae Coan & Valentich-Scott, 2010
 Tellina sandix Boss, 1968  
 Tellina scobinata Linnaeus, 1758  
 Tellina similis J. Sowerby, 1806: candystick tellin   
 Tellina simulans C. B. Adams, 1852  
 Tellina spenceri Suter, 1907: Spencer's wedge shell   
 Tellina squamifera Deshayes, 1855: crenulate tellin   
 Tellina suberis Dall, 1900
 Tellina sybaritica Dall, 1881    
 Tellina tabogensis Salisbury, 1934    
 Tellina tampaensis Conrad, 1866: Tampa tellin   
 Tellina tenella A. E. Verrill, 1874: delicate tellin   
 Tellina tenuis      
 Tellina texana Dall, 1900: say tellin, Texas tellin   
 Tellina variegata      
 Tellina versicolor DeKay, 1843: many-colored tellin   
 Tellina vespuciana (d'Orbigny, 1842): Vespucci tellin   
 Tellina virgo Hanley, 1844

References 

 ITIS
 Powell A W B, New Zealand Mollusca, William Collins Publishers Ltd, Auckland, New Zealand, 1979. .
 Glen Pownall, New Zealand Shells and Shellfish, Seven Seas Publishing Pty Ltd, Wellington, New Zealand, 1979. .
 Eugene V. Coan & Paul Valentich-Scott. "Three new species of Tellina (Bivalvia, Tellinidae) from the Panamic Province." Zootaxa 2715 (2010): 55-58.

Tellinidae
Bivalve genera